Kota Thermal Power Plant is Rajasthan's first major coal-fired power plant. It is located on the west bank of the Chambal River in Kota.

Power plant
Kota Thermal Power Station has received Meritories productivity awards during 1984, 1987, 1989, 1991 and every year since 1992 onwards.

Installed capacity

Features

See also 

 Suratgarh Super Thermal Power Plant
 Giral Lignite Power Plant
 Chhabra Thermal Power Plant

References 

Coal-fired power stations in Rajasthan
Kota district
Buildings and structures in Kota, Rajasthan
Energy infrastructure completed in 1983
1983 establishments in Rajasthan
20th-century architecture in India